Rob Fada (born May 17, 1961) is a former American football guard. He played for the Chicago Bears from 1983 to 1984 and for the Kansas City Chiefs in 1985.

References

1961 births
Living people
American football offensive guards
Pittsburgh Panthers football players
Chicago Bears players
Kansas City Chiefs players